Zafer, Dhafer or Dhaffer ( ẓāfir) is an Arabic masculine given name meaning "victorious, Conqueror, Triumphant or Victor". It is used in Arabic-speaking countries, Turkey, the Balkans, and many countries that have come into contact with Islamic culture.
People named Zafer to include:

Given name

Dhafer, Dhaffer
 Dhafer Youssef (born 1967), Tunisian composer
 Dhaffer L'Abidine (born 1972), Tunisian actor

Zafer

First name
 Zafer Algöz (born 1961), Turkish actor
 Zafer Biryol (born 1976), Turkish footballer
 Zafer Çağlayan (born 1957), Turkish politician
 Zafer Çevik (born 1984), Turkish footballer
 Zafer Gözet (born 1965), Norwegian politician of Turkish origin
 Zafer Hanım, 19th-century Ottoman Turkish woman novelist
 Zafer İlken, Turkish educator
 Zafer Kalaycıoğlu (born 1965), Turkish basketball coach
 Zafer Kılıçkan (born 1973), Turkish footballer
 Zafer al-Masri (1940–1986), Nablus mayor
 Zafer Özgültekin (born 1975), Turkish footballer
 Zafer Şakar (born 1985), Turkish footballer
 Zafer Yelen (born 1986), German footballer of Turkish origin

Middle name
 Emre Zafer Barnes (born 1988), Jamaican-Turkish sprinter

Surname
 David Zafer, Canadian violinist and pedagogue
 Rahim Zafer (born 1971), Turkish footballer

See also
 Zafar (disambiguation)

Arabic masculine given names
Turkish masculine given names